DXEM (96.9 FM), broadcasting as 96.9 Radyo Natin, is a radio station owned and operated by Manila Broadcasting Company. Its studios and transmitter are located along Quezon Ave., Marawi.

References

Radio stations established in 1997
Radio stations in Lanao del Sur